Sir Mark George Turner KC (born 27 August 1959), styled The Hon. Mr Justice Turner, is a British judge of the High Court of England and Wales.

Legal career
Turner was called to the bar at Gray's Inn in 1981. In 1998, he was appointed a Queen's Counsel. Turner became a Recorder in 2000, and was appointed to sit as a deputy High Court judge. On 28 January 2013, he was appointed a Justice of the High Court, receiving the customary knighthood in the 2013 Special Honours, and was assigned to the Queen's Bench Division. Prior to becoming a member of the judiciary, Turner practised from Crown Office Chambers and was also the head of Dean's Court Chambers.

References

1959 births
Living people
People educated at Sedbergh School
Members of Gray's Inn
Queen's Bench Division judges
Knights Bachelor